Bruno Fuligni (born 21 May 1968) is a French writer and historian.

Selected works

 Atlantes des zones extraterrestres (ed.Flammarion, 2017)

References

Living people
20th-century French historians
20th-century French writers
French people of Italian descent
Pataphysicians
1968 births
20th-century French male writers
French male non-fiction writers
21st-century French historians